Maguan Town is a rural town in Puding County, Guizhou, China.  it had a population of 44,596 and an area of .

Administrative division
, the town is divided into three residential neighborhoods and seven villages: 
Neighborhoods
Maguan Community
Mapu
Xinmapu Community

Villages
Tianxing Village
Jinhe Village
Zhongshan Village
Yuguan Village
Shuangyu Village
Puqiao Village
Tunyuan Village

Economy
The local economy is primarily based upon agriculture and local industry.

Culture
Festive lantern is the most influence local theater.

Transportation
The Guizhou-Kunming railway passes across the town east to west.

Attractions
Yuzhenshan Temple, Tianlongshan Temple and Fengxiashan Temple are Buddhist temples in the town. 

Wenchang Pavilion is a famous scenic spot.

Notable people
 Ren Kecheng (1878–1946), politician, minister of Education in the Peiyang government
 Liu Gangji (1933–2019), philosopher and professor at Wuhan University

References

Divisions of Puding County